Lion Mark may refer to:
 Lion Mark (eggs), British quality standard for eggs
Lion Mark (toys), British safety and quality standard for toys